Muhar Jamsher is a village in the Indian state of Punjab. It is located around 20 kilometers from the nearest town, Fazilka. Muhar Jamsher is noted for being one of two villages in India that is surrounded by Pakistan on three sides and by a river on the other. In February 2014, a road bridge was constructed over Sutlej for the first time to connect Muhar Jamsher with the rest of the Indian mainland.

Muhar Jamsher has a population of 1500 residents. Despite the availability of a bridge, residents have likened living in the village to that of a prison because the bridge is frequently locked by  Border Security Force for security reasons.

References

Villages in Fazilka district